Albières is a commune in the Aude department in the Occitanie region of southern France.

The inhabitants of the commune are known as	Albiérois or Albiéroises

Geography

Albières is a remote commune high in the mountains some 40 km south by south-east of Carcassonne and 40 km west by south west of Port-la-Nouvelle in a direct line. The road distance is substantially more. The D129 road running north-west from Pont d'Orbieau forms the north-eastern border of the commune but to enter the commune the D613 road branches off this road heading south-west to the village of Albières. The D613 continues west through the commune to Arques and is the only access route to the commune. There is quite an extensive network of small mountain roads in the commune. The commune is mountainous with alpine vegetation, no farming areas, and some forested areas.

There are many streams flowing through the commune with the Ruisseau d'Albières flowing through the village and north, joined by several other streams and joining L'Orbieu river which flows northwards to join the Aude near Saint-Nazaire-d'Aude.

Heraldry

Administration

List of Successive Mayors of Albières

Mayors from 1938

Population

Sites and Monuments

 Ruins of a Medieval Castle and enclosure (castrum) of the old village
The Church of Saint Martin from the 17th century contains a Painting: the Assumption which is registered as an historical object.
The Oratory of Notre-Dame des Douleurs contains a Group Sculpture: Virgin of Pity which is registered as an historical object.

Notable People linked to the commune
Raymond Busquet whose paternal family is from Albières and neighbouring villages

Associations
The ACCA of Albières: Boar Hunting
The Paradis club: Club of the Third Age of Albières
The Committee of festivals of Albières

Events
A Local Festival around 14 July (organized by the Festival Committee)
The Festival of Albières of World Music at the end of July
The Bal-musette in late August (organized by the Paradis Club)
A Theatre during the All Saints' Day holidays

See also
 Communes of the Aude department

External links
Albières on Géoportail, National Geographic Institute (IGN) website 
Albieres on the 1750 Cassini Map

References

Communes of Aude